Asura synestramena is a species of lichen moths of the family Erebidae, subfamily Arctiinae. It is found on Borneo and Bali. The habitat consists of lowland forests.

The species has an ovate marking with an eyebrow shape in the medial zone.

References

synestramena
Nudariina
Moths of Borneo
Moths described in 1900